Like Punk Never Happened: Culture Club and the New Pop is a 1986 book about 1980s pop by music journalist Dave Rimmer. The book compares 1980s pop bands with the 1970s punk rock groups that preceded them. The book "...documents the lessons New Pop musicians learned from the punk bands (more artistic control, better business acumen)." The paperback has 196 pages and it is published by Faber & Faber ( 
)

References 

1986 non-fiction books
Books about pop music
Debut books